Gamaco is a European bulk vending company, distributing products in more than 25 countries. The company is located in Boom, Belgium, about halfway between Antwerp and Brussels.

The company's products include toys, capsule collections, confectionery, stuffed toys, bouncy balls, Dubble Bubble gumballs, vending machines, gumball machines, claw cranes, capsules and arcade games.

The company moved to a new and bigger site in March 2015.

References

External links
Gamaco Web Site

Retail companies established in 1991